Carly Maria McKillip (born February 13, 1989) is a Canadian actress and musician known for her title role in the television series Alice, I Think. She also performs together with her sister Britt in the country group One More Girl. She was occasionally miscredited as Carly McKillup. She also provided the voice of Sakura Avalon, the title character of the Nelvana dubbed anime television series Cardcaptors.

Biography
McKillip was born in Vancouver, British Columbia. Her father, Tom McKillip, is a record producer, and her mother, Lynda McKillip, is a songwriter. She has a younger sister named Britt McKillip, who is also an actress.  She married Darren Savard, lead guitarist for Dallas Smith, on May 9, 2015. They have a son named Léo, born on June 29, 2019. Their second son was born a few years later.

Career
McKillip played the title role in Alice, I Think, a Canadian television series that aired 2006 on The Comedy Network and CTV. She is also the former lead vocalist in the Vancouver band Borderline. McKillip also performs together with her sister Britt in the country group One More Girl. Their debut album, Big Sky, was released on October 6, 2009, in Canada. In addition to this, the country duo came out with a new single called "The Hard Way" in 2014.

Filmography

Discography

Music videos

Awards and nominations

References

External links

 
 
 Alice I Think press release from CTV.ca
 Carly McKillip  at Young-Celebrities.com (archived 2007)

1989 births
Living people
Actresses from Vancouver
Canadian child actresses
Canadian television actresses
Canadian voice actresses
Canadian women country singers
Musicians from Vancouver
20th-century Canadian actresses
21st-century Canadian actresses
21st-century Canadian women singers